Lado B Lado A is the third album by Brazilian band O Rappa. It was produced by Chico Neves except the songs "Na Palma da Mão" and the album-title which was produced by Bill Laswell. It is distributed through Warner Music. It was elected by Rolling Stone Brasil as the 93rd best Brazilian music album.

The song Lado B Lado A was featured in the 2007 Brazilian film Tropa de Elite.

Track listing
"Tribunal De Rua" - 4:21
"Me Deixa" - 4:08
"Cristo E Oxalá" - 4:26
"O Que Sobrou Do Céu" – 3:53
"Se Não Avisar O Bicho Pega" – 5:15
"Minha Alma (A Paz Que Eu Não Quero)" - 5:04
"Lado B Lado A" - 5:05
"Favela" - 3:21
"Homem Amarelo" - 4:17
"Nó De Fumaça" - 3:45
"A Todas As Comunidades Do Engenho Novo" - 6:18
"Na Palma Da Mão" - 7:02

Personnel 

O Rappa
 Lauro Farias - bass guitar, keyboard bass in "Cristo e Oxalá", vocals
 Marcelo Falcão - vocals, acoustic guitar in "Tribunal de Rua" and "A Todas As Comunidades Do Engenho Novo", electric guitar, tamborim in "Me Deixa" and "Cristo e Oxalá", flute in "A Todas As Comunidades Do Engenho Novo"
 Marcelo Lobato - keyboards, cuíca, vibraphone, talk box and congas in "O Que Sobrou do Céu", melodica, MPC programming, derbak, flute, vocal
 Marcelo Yuka - drums; vocals in "Tribunal de Rua", derbak, cowbell and harmonium in "Minha Alma", keyboards, timbales in "Homem Amarelo", purrinhola in "Nó de Fumaça", vocals
 Xandão - electric guitar, derbak in "Nó de Fumaça", vocals in "Se Não Avisar, o Bicho Pega"

Músicos adicionais
 Bill Laswell - bass in "Na Palma da Mão"
 Carlos Eduardo Hack - violin in "Na Palma da Mão"
 DJ Negralha - scratch, metal quotes in "Me Deixa" and "Cristo e Oxalá", percussion and vocals
 Armando Marçal - pandeiro in "Favela", djembê, cuica, derbak, congas, timbale, agogô and tambourine
 Aline, Amilaque, Felipe, Fernando, Gustavo, Núbia and Pedro - children's choir in "A Todas as Comunidades do Engenho Novo"
 Carlinhos Vaca Prenha, Carlos Henrique Groid, Eduardo Fifi, Rodrigo Molusco and O Rappa - wrong handclaps in "Na Palma da Mão"

References

O Rappa albums
1999 albums